Playful Act (foaled April 12, 2002 in Ireland) is a Thoroughbred racehorse and the world's most expensive broodmare. Owned and bred by prominent British owner/breeder Robert Sangster, she was sired by the Champion Sire Sadler's Wells, she was out of the mare Magnificient Style, a granddaughter of the 1972 Epsom Derby winner, Roberto.

A success in racing at age two, Playful Act had notable wins in the 2004 Fillies' Mile and May Hill Stakes. She raced at age three with her best result a win in the Group 2 Lancashire Oaks and a second-place finish to Shawanda in the Irish Oaks.

Retired to broodmare duty, Playful Act was put up for sale in November 2007 and was purchased by Sheikh Mohammed's Darley Stud operation at the Keeneland breeding stock sale for a world record price of US$10.5 million.

References

 Playful Act's pedigree and partial racing stats
 November 5, 2007 Bloodhorse.com article titled Playful Act Sets World Record as Keeneland November Opener Surges

2002 racehorse births
Racehorses bred in Ireland
Racehorses trained in the United Kingdom
Thoroughbred family 9-f